Aliabad-e Shahid may refer to:
 Aliabad-e Shahid, Kerman
 Aliabad-e Shahid, Razavi Khorasan